The 1977–78 season was Liverpool Football Club's 86th season in existence and their 16th consecutive season in the First Division. It was a season of contrasts for Liverpool as they retained the European Cup, following a 1–0 victory against Club Brugge in the final at Wembley in London, and won the European Super Cup by beating Hamburg, who included former Liverpool forward Kevin Keegan in their side, 7–1 on aggregate with a 6–0 Second Leg win at Anfield. However, in both the Football League and the Football League Cup they would end as runners-up to newly promoted Nottingham Forest managed by Brian Clough. The replay of the Football League Cup final would prove to be very controversial with a penalty that decided the match, followed by a disallowed goal when it was adjudged that Terry McDermott handled the ball.

Liverpool manager Bob Paisley bought Kenny Dalglish from Celtic for £440,000, a record transfer fee between British clubs. Dalglish went on to score 20 goals in the league and 31 in all competitions, including the winner in the European Cup Final. Realising that Ian Callaghan was nearing the end of his career at Liverpool, the club also spent £352,000 on Graeme Souness from Middlesbrough.

However, Callaghan's final season started with a call up to the England squad, and would play in the match against Switzerland on 7 September 1977 under new manager Ron Greenwood. It was to be his first cap since playing in the 1966 FIFA World Cup finals against France.

Terry McDermott's emergence would also see him make his debut in the same match with Ray Clemence, Phil Neal, Emlyn Hughes and Ray Kennedy also playing as well. Kevin Keegan also played in the match, making it seven current and former Liverpool players in that game.

Squad

Goalkeepers
  Ray Clemence
  Peter McDonnell
  Steve Ogrizovic

Defenders
  Emlyn Hughes
  Joey Jones
  Brian Kettle
  Alec Lindsay
  Phil Neal
  Tommy Smith
  Phil Thompson
  Alan Hansen
  Colin Irwin

Midfielders
  Ian Callaghan
  Jimmy Case
  Steve Heighway
  Sammy Lee
  Ray Kennedy
  Terry McDermott
  Graeme Souness

Forwards
  David Fairclough
  Kenny Dalglish
  Kevin Kewley
  John Toshack
  David Johnson

League table

Results

First Division

FA Charity Shield

FA Cup

Football League Cup

Final

Final Replay

European Super Cup

First leg

Second Leg

European Cup

Final

References

External links
 LFC History.net – 1977–78 season
 Liverweb - 1977-78 Season

1977-1978
Liverpool
UEFA Champions League-winning seasons